Chengdu Goldenport Circuit also known as Chengdu International Circuit in English, was a permanent circuit in Shi Sheng Road, Jin Jiang, 610023 Chengdu, People's Republic of China. 

It held a round of Asian Touring Car Series (ATCS), Formula V6 Asia in 2007 and 2008.

On August 26 2008, the circuit was confirmed to be hosting a round of the 2008-09 A1 Grand Prix season. It was the fourth different circuit in China to have hosted an A1 Grand Prix race. The track hosted the second round of the Grand Prix season on 9 November 2008, the Sprint race was won by Adam Carroll of Team Ireland and the Feature race was won by Filipe Albuquerque of Team Portugal. The fastest lap at the circuit was set by Robert Doornbos of Team The Netherlands, who managed a lap of 1:15.212.

In August 2019, the venue was announced to be demolished.  According to renowned F1 journalist Joe Saward, plans are for a redevelopment of the circuit to be FIA Grade 1 in order to start work towards a second Formula One race in China.  Notebook Joe Saward's Notebook

The circuit
A1 Grand Prix's track commentator Bruce Jones compared the bumpy circuit  to Spain's Circuito Permanente del Jarama and Portugal's Autódromo do Estoril. He suggested the main straight is longer than the one at Circuit Park Zandvoort, before plunging under a bridge. Another A1GP track commentator John Watson believed that the bumps are the consequence of the track's location in an earthquake zone. 

A1 Team Australia's driver John Martin said driving on the track was like "old Mario Kart on Nintendo" because the bumps on the circuit made his car jump. There were puddles on the circuit which never dried up during the weekend and they caused spins. He also said that the surface is not ideal because the water was rising to the surface, as the track was built on part of a swamp.

Lap records

The official fastest race lap records at the Chengdu Goldenport Circuit are listed as:

References

A1 Grand Prix circuits
Sport in Chengdu
Motorsport venues in Sichuan
Sports venues in Sichuan